Los Símbolos is a Caracas Metro station on Line 3. The station is between Ciudad Universitaria and La Bandera.

References

Caracas Metro stations
1994 establishments in Venezuela
Railway stations opened in 1994